Lac de Fontaine is a lake in Haute-Savoie, France.

Fontaine